Fernando Luis Ribas Dominicci Airport , also commonly known as Isla Grande Airport, is an airport in Isla Grande, a district in the municipality of San Juan, Puerto Rico. It is owned by the Puerto Rico Ports Authority and is adjacent to the Puerto Rico Convention Center, the San Juan Bay, and the Pan American Cruise Ship Terminal, and overlooks Cataño. While Isla Grande's main activity is general aviation, it is still a commercial airport, handling domestic and international commercial flights.

It is included in the National Plan of Integrated Airport Systems for 2011–2015, which categorized it as a primary commercial service airport (more than 10,000 enplanements per year).

History

Originally constructed by the U.S. Navy as Naval Air Station Isla Grande just prior to World War II, the facility also served as Puerto Rico's main international airport until 1954, when San Juan Isla Verde International Airport (subsequently renamed Luis Muñoz Marín International Airport in 1985) was built. Until that year, all international airlines, such as Deutsche Luft Hansa, Iberia Airlines, Delta and Pan Am, flew to Isla Grande.

Until 1971, the airport also hosted Coast Guard Air Station San Juan.  That year, the Coast Guard relocated its air station to Ramey Air Force Base on Puerto Rico's northwest coast.

Isla Grande was renamed in honor of United States Air Force Major Fernando Luis Ribas-Dominicci, an F-111 pilot who was killed in action during Operation El Dorado Canyon (the 1986 airstrike of Libya).

A controversy regarding Isla Grande and Dorado Airport surfaced in 2003. Dorado Airport wanted to expand and attract the private aviation sector that has been Isla Grande's main business for so long. Dorado airport eventually became a victim of urban development in Dorado and no longer exists.

In early 2003, it was announced that the Puerto Rico Grand Prix would be held on a 1.6 mile, 10-turn, temporary circuit on the airport's runway and taxiways as the season final of the 2003 SCCA Trans Am Series. The race, held on October 26, 2003, was won by Puerto Rican native Wally Castro. The event was initially on the 2004 Trans-Am Series schedule, but was cancelled a month before it's running.

In 2006, after a detailed impact study and many rumors about the future of the airport, the Puerto Rico Ports Authority announced that Isla Grande airport would remain open for the foreseeable future, mostly because of its key function as the primary reliever for the Luis Muñoz Marín International Airport.

On August 4, 2011 the FAA announced that they were planning to close the airport's control tower due to budget cuts, since they operate it instead of the Puerto Rico Ports Authority.

On July 8, 2012 airport officials denied via written communication to a local newspaper of "any plans to eliminate or privatize the airport, since the airport is one of the most important airports for general aviation on Puerto Rico, taking into account that its operation approximates around 300 daily operations." On that same newspaper it was published that Seaborne Airlines, a regional air carrier, would transition its scheduled passenger operations to the neighboring San Juan Luis Muñoz Marin International Airport (SJU) with complete pullout on January 16, 2013.

For a short period of time between 2007 and 2009, the airport became the flight hub of Puerto Rico's unofficial flag carrier, Prinair, when that airline briefly returned to operating.

Facilities and aircraft

For the 12-month period ending September 30, 2013, the airport had 116,447 aircraft operations, an average of 319 per day: 92% general aviation, 6% air taxi, and 2% military. At that time there were 232 aircraft based at this airport: 33% single-engine, 37% multi-engine, 1% jet, 24% helicopter, and 6% military.

Airlines and destinations

Passenger

Statistics

Puerto Rico Army National Guard Aviation Support Facility
The Puerto Rico National Guard Aviation Support Facility is the only military site on Fernando Luis Ribas Dominicci Airport. Its mission is to support the Puerto Rico Army National Guard and the following units:

 Company A, 1st Battalion, 111th Aviation Regiment
 Company D, 1st Battalion, 114th Aviation Regiment
 Detachment 1, Company B, 1st Battalion, 114th Aviation Regiment

The military aircraft at this facility are UH-72 Lakota and UH-60 Blackhawk helicopters and the Beechcraft C-12 Huron.

Incidents and accidents
 On October 1, 1942, a Douglas C-39 (DC-2) of the U.S. Army Air Forces flying from Losey Field in southern Puerto Rico to Isla Grande crashed into a hill in Coamo instead, killing all 22 people on board.
 On April 11, 1952, Pan Am Flight 526A crashed into the sea just after takeoff due to engine failure, killing 52 out of 69 passengers and crew.
 On December 21, 1991, a United Airlines Boeing 757 flight en route to San Juan's Luis Muñoz Marín International Airport mistakenly landed at Fernando Luis Ribas Dominicci Airport. The aircraft, which was on a chartered flight as United Airlines Flight 5850, was later flown, without any passengers onboard (as the passengers departed from Isla Grande to their hotels by bus), to Luis Munoz Marin Airport. 
 June 7, 1992: An Executive Air (for American Eagle) CASA 212 flying from Dominicci Airport crashed short of the runway in Mayagüez, killing both crew members and all three passengers.
 In December 2002, a helicopter that had been rented from a company that operates out of this airport was hijacked and taken to a jail in Ponce, where six inmates boarded the helicopter, forcing the pilot to drop them off at a farm. The pilot was able to fly back after he lied to the prisoners about their whereabouts, making them jump off the helicopter and zig-zagging the helicopter to prevent them from shooting at him. Soon after, all escapees were found by the police.
 On January 10, 2015, a Robinson R22 collided with the ocean (near Cataño Ferry terminal, San Juan bay)  shortly after takeoff due to unknown reasons (as of 9/14/15), killing 1 (student performing a solo flight) and leaving the helicopter damaged beyond repair.
On July 4, 2017, an aircraft that had taken off Ribas Dominicci Airport crashed nearby at a bay. The crash resulted in four injuries.

See also

 Transport in Puerto Rico
 List of airports in Puerto Rico

References

External links
 Isla Grande Airport at OpenStreetMap
 
 Isla Grande Flying School
 
 
 Accident Robinson R22 Beta N348VH, 10 Jan 2015

Buildings and structures in San Juan, Puerto Rico
Airports in Puerto Rico
Miramar (Santurce)
Closed installations of the United States Navy